CTO may refer to:

Occupations
 Chief technology officer, an executive officer in an organization focused on scientific and technological issues
 Chief Technology Officer of the United States
 Certified Television Operator, an operator certified by the Society of Broadcast Engineers

Organizations
 Cape Town Opera, South African opera company
 Caribbean Tourism Organization, for sustainable tourism
 Commonwealth Telecommunications Organisation, a partnership between Commonwealth and non-Commonwealth governments, business, and civil society organisations
 Cyprus Tourism Organisation, a semi-governmental organisation in Cyprus
 CTO Hospital (Turin), a major medical center in Turin, Italy

Other
 Cancelled-to-order, a postage-stamp cancelled by the postal administration before sale to stamp-collectors
 Activated carbon filter to improve Chlorine, Taste, Odor
 Chronic total occlusion, a disease of a coronary artery of the heart
 City ticket office for an airline
 Color temperature orange, a type of color gel filter used in color correction
 Community treatment order, an implementation of mental-health law in Australia, England and most provinces in Canada

See also
 Central Treaty Organization (CenTO), a former intergovernmental military alliance